Alfredo Rullo Rizzotti, generally known as Alfredo Rizzotti (Serrana (São Paulo state) August 15, 1909 — São Paulo May 12, 1972) was a Brazilian artist, that worked with painting, drawing and interior design.

See also

List of Brazilian painters

References
  Grupo Santa Helena (or "Santa Helena Group") in Encyclopaedia Itaú Cultural of Visual Arts

1909 births
1972 deaths
Modern artists
Brazilian people of Italian descent
20th-century Brazilian painters
20th-century Brazilian male artists